Bibhu Prasad Tarai (born 17 June 1964) is an Indian politician and leader of Communist Party of India. He was a member of the Indian Parliament from Odisha in the 15th Loksabha. He represented Jagatsinghpur (Lok Sabha constituency).

See also
 Jagatsinghpur (Lok Sabha constituency)
 Indian general election in Orissa, 2009
 Communist Party of India

References

Odisha politicians
Communist Party of India politicians from Odisha
India MPs 2009–2014
1964 births
Living people
Lok Sabha members from Odisha
People from Jagatsinghpur district